The University of Wyoming (UW) is a public land-grant research university in Laramie, Wyoming. It was founded in March 1886, four years before the territory was admitted as the 44th state, and opened in September 1887. The University of Wyoming is unusual in that its location within the state is written into the state's constitution. The university also offers outreach education in communities throughout Wyoming and online.

The University of Wyoming consists of seven colleges: agriculture and natural resources, arts and sciences, business, education, engineering and applied sciences, health sciences, and law. The university offers over 120 undergraduate, graduate and certificate programs including Doctor of Pharmacy and Juris Doctor. It is classified among "R2: Doctoral Universities – High research activity".

In addition to on-campus classes in Laramie, the university's Outreach School offers more than 41 degree, certificate and endorsement programs to distance learners across the state and beyond. These programs are delivered through the use of technology, such as online and video conferencing classes. The Outreach School has nine regional centers in the state, with several on community college campuses, to give Wyoming residents access to a university education without relocating to Laramie.

Campus

Old Main

On September 27, 1886, the cornerstone of Old Main was laid, marking the beginning of the University of Wyoming. The stone is inscribed Domi Habuit Unde Disceret, which is often translated, "He need not go away from home for instruction." The following year, the first class of 42 men and women began their college education. For the next decade, the building housed classrooms, a library, and administration offices.

The style of Old Main set a precedent for all future university buildings. The main stone is rough-cut sandstone from a quarry east of Laramie, and the trim stone is smooth Potsdam Sandstone from a quarry near Rawlins. Old Main was supposed to be a monumental structure, and it was designed to be symmetrical, with a prominent central spire as the focal point. The building was also meant to reflect the character of Wyoming, and the rough stone and smooth trim represented the progressing frontier. The design of Old Main had a lasting effect on university structures, most visible in the use of a sandstone façade on nearly every building.

In 1916, the university removed the central spire because of structural concerns. The size of auditorium was reduced during a 1936 renovation. In 1949, the university thoroughly remodeled the building and completely removed the auditorium and exterior stairs. At that time, it officially became known as Old Main, and the name was carved above the east entrance. Currently, Old Main houses university administration, including the president's office and the boardroom where the trustees often meet.

Prexy's Pasture 

Prexy's Pasture is a large grassy area located within a ring of classroom and administrative buildings and serves as the center mall of the campus. The name is attributed to an obscure rule that the university president, or "prexy", is given exclusive use of the area for livestock grazing. During the administration of Arthur G. Crane, the name "Prexy's Pasture" was formally declared. Prexy's, as it is often called today, is also known for the unique pattern formed by concrete pathways that students and faculty use to cross it.

When the University of Wyoming first opened its doors in 1887, Prexy's Pasture was nothing more than an actual pasture covered in native grasses. The football team played their games there until 1922, when Corbett Field opened at the southeast corner of campus. Over time, as the needs of the university has changed, the area has been altered and redesigned. The original design was established in 1924, and in 1949, the area was landscaped with Blue Spruce and Mugo Pine. In February 1965, the board of trustees decided to construct the new science center on the west side of Prexy's Pasture. The board president, Harold F. Newton, who was concerned about the location, leaked the decision to the local press. The uproar that followed caused the board to decide on a new location for the science center and resulted in a new state statute making it necessary for any new structure built on the pasture to receive legislative approval. The statue known as "University of Wyoming Family" was installed in 1983 by UW professor Robert Russin in anticipation of the centennial celebration.

In the summer of 2004, Prexy's Pasture was remodeled as the first step in a two-part redesign project. The first step involved removing the asphalt roadway that circled the pasture and replacing it with concrete walkways to make the area a walking campus, as recommended by the 1966 and 1991 campus master plans. The grassy area was also increased, and new lampposts were installed for better lighting. The second phase of the project involved the construction of a plaza at each corner, featuring trees and rocks styled after the rocky outcrops of nearby Vedauwoo. Two of the plazas, Simpson Plaza and Cheney Plaza, have been completed.

In 2015, several exhibits from the exhibition Sculpture: A Wyoming Invitational were featured along the exterior walkway. In addition to its primary use by students travelling to and from classes or socializing, the area is host to campus barbecues and fall welcome events.

Wyoming Union

In September 1937, the university obtained a Public Works Administration loan during the Great Depression for $149,250 for construction of a student union. On March 3, 1938, ground was broken and construction began on what would become the Wyoming Union. Many students were involved in the construction, and twenty-five students were trained to be stone-cutters.

From the beginning, the union housed an assortment of student needs and activities. The formal and informal social needs were met by including a ballroom, banquet room, lounges, and game rooms. It also contained offices for student government, committees, organizations, and publications, to help meet the political and organizational needs of the student population. Lastly, a student store, post office, and bookstore completed the design.

The original design has been modified several times to accommodate changing needs and a growing student population. The first addition was completed in January 1960. This section, added to the northeast of the original structure, expanded the ballroom, made a lounge area and senate chambers adjacent to the ballroom, created the main lobby and breezeway, and provided a larger food area called The Gardens. In 1973, an addition to the north was completed to make a food court, add more space for the bookstore, and create additional offices. Also, parts of the original building were remodeled to create the Campus Activities Center, an art gallery, and a ticket outlet. In 2000, the Wyoming Union underwent extensive renovation. The $12 million project moved the food court to the main level, expanded the bookstore to the lower level, and revitalized the look and feel of the interior.

Ross Hall
Ross Hall was built in 1959 and first used as a women's dormitory. In 1975, Ross Hall was converted to academic offices. It is located on the south side of Prexy's Pasture and is named after Nellie Tayloe Ross, Wyoming's and the nation's first woman governor, elected in 1924. There is a brass plaque relief of Nellie Ross in Ross Hall. She was married to William B. Ross, the 12th governor of Wyoming, who died in office. In 2000, on Ross Hall's fourth floor, the university installed the Wyoming Press Association’s Newspaper Hall of Fame wall photos. In 2014, the Rendezvous Cafe open in the lobby.

Half Acre Gym 
The Half Acre Gym facility was constructed in 1925 to house the National Guard Armory of Laramie, as well as the athletic programs, until the field house opened in 1951. In order to fund this project, the university received a $100,000 gift from the Wyoming State Legislature, designated to be used for new buildings, such as a library, the gymnasium and armory, a power plant, an engineering building, and an expansion of the Hoyt Hall dormitory. The original structure occupied half an acre, hence the name "Half Acre Gym." It was one of the largest facilities of its type at the time.

The building has undergone several renovations to increase its size and structural safety. In 2012, the university announced a $27 million renovation to begin in the Spring of 2013 and be completed by the Fall of 2014. Groathouse Construction, a local construction management firm, carried out the project in two phases to allow maximum use of the facility while it was under construction. Phase One would consist of the demolition and recreation of the east portion of the building. Phase Two would include the reopening of the east portion and the closure and construction of the west portion, which is the historical section of the building. Throughout the renovation, the university hoped to keep and incorporate as much of the historical structure and facade as possible.

The improvements included elevators, added classrooms, a space for athletic training, new racquetball courts, a climbing wall for Bouldering, a dance studio, a jogging/walking track, and new locker rooms with access to the pool.

Coe Library
The original library at the University of Wyoming consisted of 300 books and was located in Old Main. In 1923, the library was moved to the new Aven Nelson Memorial Building. With the 1950s came a larger student population and a greater push for America to excel academically. These factors contributed to the decision by the board of trustees that it was necessary to construct a new library. However, in 1951, the state legislature rejected the funding request.

William Robertson Coe, a financier and philanthropist, came to the aid of president Humphrey in 1954 by contributing $750,000 in securities to the university. The trustees called the grant "one of the most outstanding contributions that has ever been made to the perpetuation of the American heritage" and assured Coe that the building would be "appropriately named". In 1955, the state legislature matched the Coe grant for an overall amount of $1.5 million.

Laramie architects Eliot and Clinton Hitchcock, whose father had designed the Aven Nelson Memorial Building, teamed up with the Porter and Porter firm in Cheyenne to design the new library. Their modular design was popular at the time and they intended to make the space very functional. The layout provided room for over 500,000 books and seating for at least 900 students. In May 1956, one year after the death of Coe, ground was broken and construction began on the building. The William Robertson Coe Library was finished in time for the Fall 1958 semester. In 1979, the stack tower was completed. This structure, designed by Kellogg and Kellogg of Cheyenne and Rock Springs, Wyoming, almost doubled the shelf space of the original Coe Library.

The most recent renovation of the library was completed in the fall of 2009 and officially dedicated on November 19, 2009. Hinthorne Mott Architects designed the new wing, referred to as Coe East, which added  to the library. The addition was part of a larger, $50 million project to modernize the library by integrating technology and information. The renovation created an additional 20 group study rooms, space for 180 computer terminals, and features art by James Surls.

Classroom Building
The Classroom Building, dedicated in 1971 at a cost of $1.75 million, was designed to be a general purpose building for the university. The placement and unique design by the local architects W. Eliot and Clinton A. Hitchcock makes it the focal point of the George Duke Humphrey Science Center. The building also contains four interior mosaics, designed by University of Wyoming art professors James Boyle, Joseph Deaderick, Richard Evans, and Victor Flach, that represent the quadrant of Wyoming they face. Each mosaic is over 

In 2007, after a two-year, $14.7 million renovation project, the Classroom Building reopened. The goal of the renovation was to incorporate new technology and redesign the seating better to meet the needs of students who carry laptops and backpacks. The building was also retrofitted with air conditioning. The unique characteristics of the original building, such as the circular design and mosaics, were maintained.

Housing

The university has four residence halls and four apartment complexes. The four residence halls, Orr, White, Downey, and McIntyre, are connected together via the Washakie Dining Center, which contains the main dining hall and other student services. These residence halls house primarily freshmen. All incoming freshmen are expected to live in the residence halls during their first year, with some exceptions.

Each of the residence halls is named after an influential administrator or faculty member. Downey Hall is an eight-story dormitory located southwest of the Washakie Dining Center and is named after June Etta Downey. Located west of the Washakie Dining Center is White Hall, a dormitory named after Laura Amanda White. At twelve stories and 146 feet, White Hall is the second tallest building in the state of Wyoming, two feet shorter than the Wyoming Financial Center in Cheyenne. McIntyre Hall, named after Clara Frances McIntyre, is located east of the Washakie Dining Center. This twelve-story building underwent extensive renovations in 2004 and 2005. Just northeast of McIntyre Hall is the eight-story Orr Hall, named after Harriet Knight Orr. From 2005 to 2006, Orr Hall also underwent extensive renovations to modernize its living space.

The University Apartments are located east of War Memorial Stadium. They are available on a first-come, first-serve basis to all University of Wyoming students above freshman standing. Currently there are apartment units in a variety of layouts in the River Village, Bison Run, Landmark, and Spanish Walk apartment complexes.

Museums

The University of Wyoming is home to several facilities that allow the public to view their unique collections.

American Heritage Center
The American Heritage Center, located in the Centennial Complex, is an extensive repository of manuscripts, photographs, artworks, movies, audio recordings, and other items. It is one of the largest non-governmental archives west of the Mississippi River. It is also home to the Toppan Library, which contains over 50,000 rare books. Because of its size, the AHC has many collecting areas. It features Wyoming and Western history from the early nineteenth to the twenty-first century; women's suffrage; transportation history, including railroad history (especially the transcontinental railroad) as well as aviation; and mineral, coal, and oil extraction. It has extensive entertainment collections in: theater; radio and television; film; music; Hollywood (from Jack Benny and Barbara Stanwyck to Stan Lee); politics and journalism; authors; composers; and artists.

University of Wyoming Art Museum
The University of Wyoming Art Museum is also located in the Centennial Complex on East Willet Drive. The museum's collections include art in many media from around the world, including: European and American paintings, prints, sculpture and drawings; 18th and 19th century Japanese Ukiyo-e prints; 15th through 19th century Persian and Indian miniature paintings; 20th century Haitian art; 20th century Japanese netsuke; 20th century and contemporary photography; and Rapa Nui, African, and Native American artifacts. Artists in the collection include Thomas Hart Benton, Ralston Crawford, Jun Kaneko, Hung Liu, Aristide Maillol, Joan Miró, Richard Misrach, Robert Rauschenberg and Paul Signac. The museum also hosts changing exhibits of art from around the world. The Centennial Complex was designed by Antoine Predock and opened in 1993.

In collaboration with the College of Law, the museum conducts research and instruction on the Native American Graves Protections and Repatriation Act (NAGPRA) and legal issues surrounding the repatriation of human remains.

University of Wyoming Geological Museum

The University of Wyoming's Geological Museum houses a collection of fossils and minerals with special focus on the history of Wyoming. When the University of Wyoming was founded, the museum was essentially the small personal collection of Professor J.D. Conley. In 1893, Wilbur Knight, who was hired as a professor of mining and geology, took over as the museum curator. The museum moved to the Hall of Science in 1902 and continued to expand. By the time the collection was moved to its current location in 1956, Knight's son Samuel Howell Knight had made the university's Geology Department well known around the country. Samuel Howell Knight acquired many of the exhibits and paintings that are still on display, including the copper Tyrannosaurus at the entrance, the initial mounting of the Apatosaurus skeleton centerpiece, and the terracotta Stegosaurus and Triceratops panels.

One of the most famous exhibits at the museum is the Allosaurus known as "Big Al." It was featured in the BBC documentary The Ballad of Big Al. The University of Wyoming Geological Museum has also received coverage from National Geographic, CNN, Earth Magazine, Walter Cronkite, and NBC Nightly News with Tom Brokaw, and it has been shown on many dinosaur programs. On June 30, 2009, the museum was closed to meet state budget cuts. Following this controversial decision, an endowment fund was set up to support the museum. After substantial infrastructure upgrades, the museum reopened to the public on January 12, 2013 and resumed its regular hours with free admission. Some exhibits, like the Late Cretaceous display, have been completed, while others are still under renovation.

University of Wyoming Anthropology Museum
The University of Wyoming Anthropology Museum is operated by the Anthropology Department and is located in the Anthropology Building at 12th and Lewis Streets. Exhibits are spread throughout three floors of the building. Displays include early humans, the Colby Mammoth Site, Vore Buffalo Jump, and other Wyoming archaeology sites.

University of Wyoming Insect Museum
The University of Wyoming Insect Museum is a research museum located in the Agriculture Building. Displays include mounted insects, a small zoo with living insects, and an interactive discovery cabinet.

Colleges and schools

Agriculture and Natural Resources
The College of Agriculture and Natural Resources offers teaching, research labs and field environments, and an indoor livestock teaching arena.

Arts and Sciences 

The College of Arts and Sciences offers more than 50 majors, 60 minors, and seven interdisciplinary programs. Geology, Archaeology, Botany, and Geography programs take advantage of Wyoming's unique environment, while International Studies, Sociology, and Political Science provide global context. A&S emphasizes field study, internships, and individual research projects, and has exchange programs and study abroad.

In 2010, the university announced that it had received its largest estate gift ever, from the artist Neltje Doubleday Kings, known as Neltje, consisting of her ranches, art collection, and other holdings. When realized, the gift will create the UW Neltje Center for the Visual and Literary Arts, combining programs of three of the university's departments: creative writing, arts, and the art museum.

Business
The College of Business is accredited at the undergraduate and graduate levels by AACSB. More than 100 business scholarships are awarded annually.

Education
The College of Education comprises two schools: the School of Counseling, Leadership, Advocacy, and Design; and the School of Teacher Education. Both certificates and programs that lead to initial certification or endorsements by Wyoming's Professional Teaching Standards Board (PTSB) are offered for pre-service teachers. Partnerships with Wyoming public schools provide for hands-on experience in real classrooms, and the on-campus, K-9 lab school provides a model of teaching and learning. The Counselor Education Training Clinic within the college offers free services for individuals, couples, families, adults, adolescents, and children. Services are provided by advanced graduate students under qualified clinical supervision.

Engineering and Applied Sciences

Offering 12 programs of study, the College of Engineering and Applied Science provides also undergraduate research opportunities, an International Engineering Program, and Earth Systems Science.

Health Sciences
The College of Health Science offers programs in pharmacy, nursing, social work, kinesiology, communication disorders, and dental hygiene, and students have the opportunity to receive pre-professional advising.

Honors College
In May 2017, the university began working to change the Honors Program to the Honors College and search for an Honors College Dean from within the current university faculty.

The Helga Otto Haub School of Environment and Natural Resources
The University of Wyoming's Haub School of Environment and Natural Resources (ENR) advances the understanding and resolution of environment and natural resource challenges through education, dissemination of information, and collaborative decision making support. Its academic programs emphasize interdisciplinary learning, providing students with applied learning experiences that prepare them to consider multiple perspectives to address natural resource issues. The Ruckelshaus Institute produces reports and convenes events on natural resource issues. The school School offers courses in negotiation, facilitation, and media relations for natural resource professionals. The Biodiversity Institute provides research, education, and outreach to support biodiversity conservation and management. In 2016, the university announced that the Haub School would become a full academic college beginning in the 2017 academic year.

Law
The College of Law was founded in 1920, and has been accredited by the American Bar Association since 1923. Its location in the Rocky Mountain West has provided a direct connection to regional and global issues in environmental, natural resources, and energy law. The alumni includes many state and federal judges, governors, senators and a former United States Ambassador to Ireland, and offers eight clinical and practicum programs providing students with hands-on experience in the Brimmer Legal Education Center.

Outreach School
The mission of the University of Wyoming's Outreach School is to extend the University of Wyoming to the state and the world, and bring the world to Wyoming. It has several divisions. Outreach Credit Programs, in partnership with the university's colleges and departments, delivers both in and outside the state more than 41 degrees, programs, and certificates, both online or through "blended" learning technologies such as audio conferencing, video conferencing, and correspondence study. As of Spring 2014, Outreach School students accounted for 23.6% of enrollments at the University of Wyoming. There are nine Outreach Regional Centers in Wyoming, each with an Academic Coordinator and staff provide student support services. The University of Wyoming at Casper is a partnership between the University of Wyoming and Casper College and offers a small, residential campus experience. Students at UW-Casper can pursue bachelor's, master's, and doctorate degrees, as well as certificates and endorsements. The International Programs Office supports both international students and faculty and provides a number of different international study opportunities. Wyoming Public Media operates three radio services that cover 90% of Wyoming, as well as an online service and NPR news service. Outreach Technology Services, including UWTV, provides technological access to students enrolled in distance courses, as well as those at UW-Casper. Additionally, the Outreach School administers Summer Session, J-Term, and Saturday University.

Schools and Institutes

Enhanced Oil Recovery Institute and School of Energy Resources

The Enhanced Oil Recovery Institute (EORI) was formed regarding the implementation of Enhanced Oil Recovery (EOR) techniques in Wyoming. The mission of EORI is "to promote the recovery of Wyoming's 'stranded' oil." The Institute assists Wyoming operators with EOR projects by applying existing technologies and creating new knowledge when necessary, maximize the economic potential, minimize the risk of EOR projects, facilitate the testing, evaluation, and documentation of EOR recommendations in the real world settings, and transfer the information to Wyoming producers by forming partnerships and conducting workshops and conferences.

The School of Energy Resources (SER) at the University of Wyoming was created in 2006 to enhance the university's energy-related education, research, and outreach. SER showcases the many energy research projects at UW and bridges academics and industry.

Campus organizations

Associated Students of the University of Wyoming (ASUW)
The Associated Students of the University of Wyoming (ASUW) is the title of the student body at the University of Wyoming. Every full-time student is a member of the ASUW and can vote in the elections of the ASUW Student Government. ASUW consists of three branches: the legislative, executive, and judicial branches. ASUW Also hosts several programs including the First-Year Senate, Associated Students Technical Services (ASTEC), Non-Traditional Student Council, Student Legal Services, United Multicultural Council, and the UW Food Share Pantry.

Campus Sustainability Committee
The university's Campus Sustainability Committee (CSC) advises all departments and program on sustainability matters and oversees the university's efforts and progress towards reducing its carbon footprint. All new campus buildings are required to meet LEED (Leadership in Energy and Environmental Design) Silver certification of the U.S. Green Building Council (USGBC). UW president Tom Buchanan signed the American College & University Presidents Climate Commitment (ACUPCC) in 2007. For their advances on university sustainability, UW scored a "C" on the College Sustainability Report Card of the Sustainable Endowments Institute.

Friday Night Fever
The goal of Friday Night Fever (FNF) is to offer alcohol-free late-night entertainment for University of Wyoming students. The events vary by the week and are diverse to include all students. Past events sponsored by FNF include comedians, magicians, hypnotists, the UW Idol Competition, Salsa Dancing, Casino Night, and inflatable games. The organization also regularly shows first-run movies in the Wyoming Union every Friday night at 6:30 pm, 9:00 pm, and 11:30 pm

Greek letter organizations
Nearly all fraternities and sororities are located on campus in private or university owned houses. Houses are located on Fraternity and Sorority Row. Most of the Fraternities and the Honors House line the northern (Fraternity) road and Sororities and two fraternities line the southern (Sorority) road. In 2016 and 2017 the university bought the three vacant houses (previously occupied by Pi Kappa Alpha, Alpha Tau Omega, and Pi Beta Phi) with the intention of demolishing the Pi Kappa Alpha house (as it had been condemned during its vacancy), and renovating and renting the Alpha Tau Omega and Pi Beta Phi houses.

Outdoor program

The Outdoor Program (OP), located in the south lobby of Half Acre, offers many activities for the outdoor enthusiasts. The program was established in 1997 to provide a wide variety of educational training and to equip students to pursue adventures on their own. Through the OP, students can go on a variety of single, multiday, and week-long excursions. A few examples of the trips offered are rock climbing, white water rafting, ice climbing, snowshoeing, backcountry skiing, and mountain biking. Some of the educational programs offered are avalanche training, ski/snowboard maintenance, bike maintenance, and lead climbing courses. The Outdoor Program is subsidized by student fees and participants only pay for the trip expenditures. Equipment such as snowshoes, mountain bikes, camping supplies, and backpacking gear are available for rent. The OP also offers several events throughout the year such as bouldering competitions at the Half Acre gym and the Banff Film Festival "World Tour".

SafeRide
Founded in the fall of 2000, the goal of SafeRide is to prevent drinking and driving by offering on call service Thursday, Friday, and Saturday nights. Since then, it has transported over 160,000 passengers. Each SafeRide vehicle is clearly marked by an illuminated sign. On January 23, 2009, the 150,000th rider was presented with a US$1000 scholarship.

Transit & Parking Services

Transit & Parking Services monitors parking lots and provides transportation to the University of Wyoming campus. The transit service consists of different systems that operate independently. Transit & Parking Services offers a variety of parking options, including various permitting options and metered parking.

The University of Wyoming offers a separate transit service for passengers unable to ride the fixed routes due to a disability. Eligibility is determined through the Transit and Parking office.

Transit & Parking Services also operates the Night Owl Express, which provides on-call service from 1:00 pm to 6:00 am on weekdays and 24 hours a day on the weekends. The service can be requested by pressing the black buttons at one of the shelters on campus.

Athletics

University of Wyoming athletics teams are named the Cowboys and Cowgirls. Their official song is "Ragtime Cowboy Joe". Wyoming competes at the NCAA Division I level (FBS-Football Bowl Subdivision for football) as a member of the Mountain West Conference. UW offers 17 NCAA-sanctioned sports – nine women's sports and eight men's sports. Wyoming's nine NCAA sports for women are: basketball; cross country; golf; soccer; swimming and diving; tennis; indoor track & field; outdoor track and field; and volleyball. UW's eight NCAA sports for men are: basketball; cross country; football; golf; swimming and diving; indoor track and field; outdoor track and field; and wrestling.

The "Black 14"
In 1969 football coach Lloyd Eaton kicked 14 Black players off the team for wanting to protest what they considered the racist policies within Brigham Young University (BYU) and the LDS Church before a game with BYU. After the team went 1–9 the following year, the school decided to remove him. In 2019, the school publicly apologized for this incident, and invited all living players back to campus to be honored.

Notable alumni

Josh Allen (Class of 2017)  – NFL quarterback for the Buffalo Bills; first round NFL draft pick in 2018.
 Jim Anderson – Republican member of the Wyoming Senate (2001–2015); former member of the Wyoming House of Representatives (1997–2000).
 Rodney Anderson – former member of the Wyoming House of Representatives
Florence F. Arenberg (M.S. 1939), botanist and educator based in Chicago
Gideon Ariel (born 1939) – Israeli Olympic competitor in the shot put and discus throw
 Jillian Balow (B.A., 1993) – Wyoming superintendent of public instruction, effective 2015 
 Eli Bebout – Wyoming state senator from Riverton since 2007, former Speaker of the Wyoming House of Representatives, Republican gubernatorial nominee in 2002
 Rigo Beltrán – former Major League Baseball pitcher
 Larry Birleffi (Class of 1942) – announcer for all Wyoming Cowboys football and basketball games from 1947 to 1986
 Charles Bradley – NBA basketball player
 Jerry Buss – Businessman and owner of the Los Angeles Lakers of the NBA
 Brandon Carlisle, Ray Carlisle, and Miguel Chen – Members of Teenage Bottlerocket
 Dick Cheney – 46th vice president of the United States of America (under President George W. Bush), U.S. congressman, White House Chief of Staff (served under President Gerald Ford) and U.S. Defense Secretary (served under President George H. W. Bush)
 Francis Chesley – linebacker for the Green Bay Packers
 Darnell Clash – American football player
 Steve Cochran – actor
 Derek Cooke (born 1991) – basketball player for Hapoel Gilboa Galil of the Israeli Basketball Premier League
 Hayden Dalton (born 1996) – basketball player for Hapoel Holon of the Israeli Basketball Premier League
 Josh Davis – NBA basketball player
 Fennis Dembo – NBA basketball player
 W. Edwards Deming – former engineer, statistician, professor, author, lecturer, and management consultant. Developed the Total Quality Management philosophy.
 Conrad Dobler – Former 3x Pro Bowler offensive guard in the NFL.
 Floyd Dominy – Bureau of Reclamation Commissioner 1959–1969
 Lloyd Eaton – head football coach who kicked all 14 black players off the team for considering a protest.
 Rick Edgeman - Professor of Sustainability & Enterprise Performance, Aarhus University (Denmark). Professor & Chair of Management and Center for Entrepreneurship Director, Fort Hays State University (Kansas). Academician of the International Academy of Quality - one of only 100 members of this joint Who's Who of the American Society for Quality, European Organisation for Quality, and Japanese Union of Scientists and Engineers.
 Aaron Elling – NFL placekicker
 Floyd Esquibel, member of the Wyoming Senate and former member of the Wyoming House of Representatives
 Bob Fitzke – MLB and NFL player
 Dave Freudenthal – former Governor of Wyoming
 Malcom Floyd – wide receiver for the San Diego Chargers
 John Frullo – Texas State Representative 2010–present
 Ted Gilmore – wide receivers coach for the Wisconsin Badgers
Adam Goldberg (born 1980), NFL offensive tackle
 Curt Gowdy – Sportscaster
Clifford Hansen – former Wyoming republican governor and US senator
 John J. Hickey – U.S. senator from Wyoming
 Cindy Hill – Wyoming Superintendent of Public Instruction 2011–2015
 Gretchen Hofmann – professor of ecological physiology of marine organisms at the University of California, Santa Barbara.
 Richard Honaker – attorney, former state legislator, unsuccessful nominee for U.S. District Judge
 Art Howe – former MLB player and manager.
 Jeff Huson – former Major League Baseball player and current commentator for the Colorado Rockies
 Robert H. Johnson – state senator from Rock Springs, 1967–1978
 Korey Jones, CFL player
 Jim Kiick – halfback for Miami Dolphins 1968–1974
 Eric Leckner – NBA Basketball Player
 John A. List – economics professor at the University of Chicago, known for pioneering use of field experiments in economics
 Tom Lubnau – speaker of the Wyoming House since January 2013, holds bachelor's and law degree from UW.
 Cynthia Lummis – U.S. senator and former U.S. representative for Wyoming
 Derrick Martin – cornerback for the New York Giants
Karyl McBride – psychotherapist and author
 Rodger McDaniel – attorney, author, member of both houses of Wyoming legislature.
 Leonard McEwan – former member of the Wyoming Supreme Court and the Fourth District Court in Sheridan
 M. Margaret McKeown – judge on the United States Court of Appeals for the Ninth Circuit
 Mary Mead – Republican gubernatorial nominee in 1990; Jackson rancher and businesswoman
 Matt Mead – governor of Wyoming
 Dale Memmelaar – NFL offensive lineman
 Joseph B. Meyer – Wyoming attorney general and state treasurer
 Larry Nance Jr. – forward for the Cleveland Cavaliers
 Bob Nicholas (Class of 1982) – member of Wyoming House of Representatives from Cheyenne since 2011
 Stephen Nicholas – founder of Incarnation Children's Center (for children with AIDS/HIV); chief of pediatrics, Harlem Hospital
 Jay Novacek – five-time pro bowl NFL Tight End
 Blake Neubert – Artist
 Chuck Pagano – Former Head Coach Indianapolis Colts of the NFL
 Susan Pamerleau (Class of 1968), retired United States Air Force major general and the Republican sheriff of Bexar County, Texas, first woman elected to that office, 2012
 Owen Petersen, Republican member of the Wyoming House of Representatives.
 Samuel C. Phillips – director of NASA's Apollo program from 1964 to 1969, director of the National Security Agency from 1972 to 1973, and commander of the Air Force Systems Command from 1973 to 1975.
 John Pilch – former NBA player
 Ken Pomeroy (M.S.) – college basketball statistical specialist and operator of the statistical site and blog KenPom.com
 Wayde Preston – television actor
 Chris Prosinski – Safety for the Chicago Bears
 Bill Quayle, athletics director for Emporia State University from 1979 to 1999.
 Theo Ratliff – Center for the Charlotte Bobcats of the NBA
Jeron Roberts (born 1976) – American-Israeli basketball player
 Ken Sailors – Inventor of the jump shot; former NBA player.
 Justin Salas – wrestler (2000–2003); current professional mixed martial arts fighter, competing for the UFC in the Lightweight division
 Billie Sutton– professional Bronc rider and candidate for Governor of South Dakota.
 General Peter J. Schoomaker – Army Chief of Staff
 Marlan Scully – theoretical physicist
 Matthew Shepard – brought attention to LGBT rights in the US and led to new federal hate crime legislation, after being tortured and murdered. Did not graduate. (Matthew Shepard and James Byrd, Jr. Hate Crimes Prevention Act). 
 Alan K. Simpson – former U.S. senator 
 Pete Simpson – former state representative, UW administrator and Hall of Fame member
 Shakir Smith, professional basketball player
 Truett Smith – American football player
 Carol Tomé – CEO of UPS
 Scottie Vines – former wide receiver for the Detroit Lions
 James Watt – Secretary of the Interior in the Reagan administration
 Alvin Wiederspahn (1949–2014) – Cheyenne lawyer, historical preservationist, rancher, and member of both houses of the Wyoming State Legislature 
 Chancey Williams – country music singer/songwriter
 Justin Williams – power forward/center for the Sacramento Kings of the NBA
 Tony Windis – former NBA player for the Detroit Pistons
Jack Weil – former punter for the Denver Broncos and Washington Redskins. First Wyoming athlete to be a consensus All-American.
Penny Wolin – photographer
Tak Chiu Wong – saxophonist

Notable faculty 
 Samuel H. Knight, geology professor, 1916–1966
Merav Ben-David (Hebrew: מירב בן-דוד; January 17, 1959 – ), chair of the Department of Zoology and Physiology and Democratic nominee in the 2020 United States Senate election in Wyoming 
 Ana Paula Höfling, Professor of dance
 Elizabeth Orpha Sampson Hoyt (1828–1912), philosopher, author, lecturer
 Gale W. McGee (1915–1992), professor of history and international affairs, U.S. senator (D-WY) (1959–1977), and U.S. ambassador to the Organization of American States (1977–1981)
 Aven Nelson (1859–1952), botanist and UW president (1918–1922) 
 Robert Russin (1914–2007), sculptor
 Allan Arthur Willman (1909–1989), composer, head of the Music Department
Glen Anderson Rebka, Jr. (1931 – January 13, 2015), head of Physics Department

See also
 Owen Wister Review

Notes

References

External links

 
 Wyoming Athletics website
 
 

 
Public universities and colleges in Wyoming
Land-grant universities and colleges
University of Wyoming
Flagship universities in the United States
Education in Albany County, Wyoming
Tourist attractions in Laramie, Wyoming
Historic American Buildings Survey in Wyoming
1886 establishments in Wyoming Territory